Chew Jun Ru is a Singaporean musician known for his contributions to the country's erhu scene. In 2013, he became the first graduate of the Royal College of Music (RCM) to play a Chinese traditional instrument.

Early life and family
In his early life, Chew was already an avid player of the erhu. He attended Rosyth Primary School, Nanyang Junior College and the Nanyang Academy of Fine Arts. Born to a working-class family of four children (Chew being the eldest), his father Sin Hwa is a business person and founder of ICO Music and Culture Consultancy while his mother is a homemaker.

Career
Pursuing his interest in the erhu, Chew applied to study at the Singapore Nanyang Academy of Fine Arts (NAFA) validated by the London-based Royal College of Music (RCM) in collaboration with the Central Conservatory of Music in Beijing, China. He managed to take up erhu as an instrument, despite RCM not having a Chinese traditional instrument department. Graduating in August 2013 at his alma mater (NAFA), he became the "first graduate [of RCM] specialising in a Chinese traditional instrument".

References

Year of birth missing (living people)
Living people
Alumni of the Royal College of Music
Nanyang Academy of Fine Arts alumni
Singaporean musicians